The 2021–22 season was Northampton Town's 124th year in their history and first season back in League Two since the 2019–20 season, following relegation from League One. Along with League Two, the club also competed in the FA Cup, EFL Trophy and the EFL Cup. The season covers the period from 1 July 2021 to 30 June 2022.

Players

Pre-season
The Cobblers announced their first pre-season friendly against Birmingham City, as part of the club's open day. This was soon followed by a match against West Ham United. The club announced a number of local games on May 28. A seventh friendly against Cambridge United was announced on 8 June. Nottingham Forest was then confirmed on 28 June.

Competitions

League Two

League table

Results summary

League position by match

Matches
Northampton Town's fixtures were announced on 24 June 2021.

Play-offs

FA Cup

Northampton were drawn at home to Cambridge United in the first round.

Carabao Cup

Northampton were drawn away to Coventry City in the first round and at home to AFC Wimbledon in the second round.

Papa John's Trophy

Cobblers were drawn into Southern Group D alongside Brighton & Hove Albion U21s, Forest Green Rovers and Walsall. The group stage ties were confirmed on 1 July 2021.

Appearances, goals and cards

Clean sheets
Includes all competitive matches.

Scores overview
Northampton Town' score given first.

Awards

Club awards
At the end of the season, Northampton's annual award ceremony, including categories voted for by the players and backroom staff, the supporters, will see the players recognised for their achievements for the club throughout the 2021–22 season.

Divisional awards

Transfers

Transfers in

Loans in

Loans out

Transfers out

References

Northampton Town
Northampton Town F.C. seasons